Jalna  is a city in Jalna district in the Aurangabad Division, or Marathwada region, of the Indian state of Maharashtra. It was part of Hyderabad State as a tehsil of Aurangabad district, before Jalna district was formed effective 1 May 1981.

Geography 

Climate

Demographics 

 census, Jalna had a population of 285,577. The total population constitute, 147,029 males and 138,485 females —a sex ratio of 942 females per 1000 males. 38,834 children are in the age group of 0–6 years, of which 20,338 are boys and 18,496 are girls. The average literacy rate stands at 81.80% with 201,829 literates.

Economy 
The first cotton-ginning & oil-pressing factory was established in the year 1863 by Mr. Pestonji Meherwanji.

In 1889 a cotton-spinning and weaving mill was erected in Aurangabad city, which employed 700 people. With the opening of the Hyderabad–Godavari Valley Railways in the year 1900, several ginning factories were started. In Jalna alone, there were 9 cotton-ginning factories and 5 cotton presses, besides two ginning factories at Aurangabad and Kannad, and one oil press at Aurangabad. The total number of people employed in the cotton presses and ginning factories in the year 1901 was 1,016.

Jalna is the biggest producer of sweet lemons and oranges in Maharashtra.

Jalna is the biggest steel producer in Maharashtra state, with many steel companies located in the Maharashtra Industrial Development Corporation (MIDC) area.

Transport 
Jalna is primarily connected with the rest of India by railway and road.

Air

High Speed Rail
Jalna is going to be an important station in the middle of the bullet train project proposed between Mumbai and Nagpur. So in the future, Jalna is going to get a boost of high speed transport connectivity.

Rail 
 is a station located on the Secunderabad–Manmad line of the newly created Nanded Division of South Central Railway. Formerly, it had been a part of Hyderabad Division, before divisional adjustments in 2003, which saw HYB's bifurcation.

Road 
Jalna is connected to major towns of the state by state highways. Road connectivity is excellent, roads connecting to Aurangabad, Pune, Ahmednagar, Nagpur, Nanded, Parbhani, Beed, Khamgaon, and Mumbai having been upgraded to four-lane highways. The new Mumbai-Nagpur Expressway (Samruddhi Mahamarg) passes through Jalna.

Dry port 
Recently, a new dry port project has been set up in the MIDC Phase 3 area near the city. This is the first dry port project in the country. A similar, smaller project is also in progress in Wardha.

See also 
Marathwada
Jalna Dry Port

Jalna-Nanded Expressway

References

External links 
 Jalna Online at India Online Network

Cities and towns in Jalna district
Cities in Maharashtra
Jalna, Maharashtra